Batnfjordsøra is the administrative centre of Gjemnes Municipality in Møre og Romsdal county, Norway. The village is located at the end of the Batnfjorden at the mouth of the river Batnfjordelva. European Route E39 passes through the village on its way from Molde to Trondheim.

The village of Øre lies about halfway between Torvikbukt and Batnfjordsøra. Heading southwest along E39, you will get to Hjelset and Molde.

References

Gjemnes
Villages in Møre og Romsdal